Filobacillus milensis is a species of halophilic spore-forming bacteria, the type and only current species of its genus. Its cells are motile, strictly aerobic rods which stain Gram-negative. Its type strain is SH 714T (= DSM 13259T = ATCC 700960T).

References

Further reading
Sneath, Peter HA, et al. Bergey's Manual of Systematic Bacteriology. Volume 3. Williams & Wilkins,  2012.
Satyanarayana, T., Bhavdish Narain Johri, and Anil Prakash. "Microorganisms in environmental management." Microbes and Environment (2012).
De Vos, Paul. Endospore-forming Soil Bacteria. Ed. Niall A. Logan. Vol. 27. Springer, 2011.

External links

LPSN

Bacillaceae